The Ultimate Collection is an Ace of Base compilation album released by Universal Music Netherlands in May 2005. Each CD includes some of their biggest hits, plus a third bonus CD with only remixes, mostly from their debut album.

Track listing

Disc: 1

 All That She Wants
 Wheel of Fortune
 Happy Nation
 The Sign
 Waiting for Magic
 Don't Turn Around
 Living in Danger
 Lucky Love
 Beautiful Life
 Never Gonna Say I'm Sorry
 My Déjà Vu
 Perfect World
 Life Is a Flower
 Cruel Summer
 
Disc: 2

 Donnie
 Travel to Romantis
 Always Have, Always Will
 Everytime It Rains
 Cecilia
 Tokyo Girl
 C'est la Vie
 Hallo Hallo
 Love in December
 Beautiful Morning
 Unspeakable
 The Juvenile
 Da Capo
 What's the Name of the Game

Disc: 3

 Wheel of Fortune [Original Club Mix][*]
 My Mind [Mindless Mix][*]
 All That She Wants [Banghra Version][*]
 Happy Nation [Remix][*]
 The Sign [Dub Version][*]
 Don't Turn Around [Stretch Version][*]
 Lucky Love [Armand's 'British Nites' Remix][*]
 Cruel Summer [Big Bonus Mix][*]
 Megamix: Wheel of Fortune/All That She Wants/Don't Turn Around/The Sign

References

Ace of Base compilation albums
2005 compilation albums
2005 remix albums
Universal Music Group remix albums
Universal Music Group compilation albums